Yitzhak Saban (born 15 July 1952) is a former Israeli politician who served as a member of the Knesset for Shas between 1999 and 2003.

An accountant by trade, Saban was placed 14th on the Shas list for the 1999 elections, and entered the Knesset as the party won 17 seats.

He lost his seat in the 2003 elections.

References

External links

1952 births
Living people
Shas politicians
Members of the 15th Knesset (1999–2003)